The Salween is a Southeast Asian river, about  long, flowing from the Tibetan Plateau south into the Andaman Sea. The Salween flows primarily within southwest China and eastern Myanmar (Burma), with a short section forming the border of Burma and Thailand. Throughout most of its course, it runs swiftly through rugged mountain canyons. Despite the river's great length, only the last  are navigable, where it forms a modest estuary and delta at Mawlamyine. The river is known by various names along its course, including Thanlwin in Burma and Nu River in China. The commonly used spelling "Salween" is an anglicisation of the Burmese name dating from 19th-century British maps.

Due to its great range of elevation and latitude coupled with geographic isolation, the Salween basin is considered one of the most ecologically diverse regions in the world, containing an estimated 25 percent of the world's terrestrial animal species and thousands of plant species. Along its course the Salween provides water for agriculture and supports abundant fisheries, especially in the delta region. The Salween basin is home to numerous ethnic minority groups, whose ancestors largely originated in the Tibetan Plateau and northwest China. Starting about 5,000 years ago, people began migrating south along the river, establishing small kingdoms and city-states.

During the last 1,000 years, the Salween has defined various frontiers of the Burmese empires to the west, the Kingdom of Siam to the south, and Imperial China to the east, with the Shan States along the middle Salween being a frequently contested area. In the 19th century, the British Empire invaded Burma with Mawlamyine serving as the colonial capital for many decades. Since Burmese independence in 1948, the Salween basin has been a battleground for several fronts of the Burmese Civil War, with large areas in Shan State and Karen State (Kayin State) contested between the Burmese military and local ethnic militias.

The Salween is one of the least fragmented large river systems in Asia, with only a few small dams in the headwaters of the river and on tributaries. Since the 1970s, the Burmese and Thai governments have sought to build massive hydroelectric dams along the river. China also planned to dam the upper Salween, but in 2016 these plans were dropped in favor of establishing a national park. The future of dam projects in Myanmar and Thailand remains uncertain.

Geography and naming
The basin is extremely long and narrow, situated between the Irrawaddy and Brahmaputra river systems on the west and the Mekong system on the east, and sharing a shorter boundary with the Yangtze system to the north. In China, the Salween basin is situated in Tibet Autonomous Region and Yunnan. In Burma the Salween flows through Shan State, Karenni State, Karen State and Mon State. In Thailand the Salween borders only on Mae Hong Son Province, with tributaries extending into Chiang Mai, Tak and Kanchanaburi Province.

About 89 percent of the annual flow occurs in the monsoon season (mid-May through November), and only 11 percent in the remainder of the year.

The population of the Salween basin is estimated at 24 million, or 76 persons/km2. About 10 million people live adjacent or close to the river proper. People of the Salween basin represent a large diversity of ethnic groups. In China, the Salween basin is home to Blang, Derung, Lisu, Nu, Palaung (De'ang), Shan, Tibetan and Wa. In Burma and Myanmar, the major ethnic groups include Akha, Lahu, Lisu, Hmong, Kachin, Karen, Karenni, Kokang, Pa'O, Shan and Yao. The highest population densities are in Mon State (300 people/km2) and Yunnan (100 people/km2), while the lowest population density is in Tibet (5 people/km2).

Upper Salween (China)

The Salween originates in the Tanggula Mountains in the central Tibetan Plateau. The headwaters are located near Dengka Peak, east of Tanggula Pass. Downstream of the lake, the Tibetan section of the river is called Gyalmo Nagqu, "black river". In Tibet the river flows mostly within Nagqu prefecture.

From Cona Lake, the river flows south and turns east near Nagqu Town, where the Chalong hydroelectric station is situated. Further east, the river is dammed at the smaller Jiquan hydroelectric station. As of 2017, these are the only two dams on the Salween River proper. Continuing east, it is joined by the Ka, Suo and Ga rivers, all flowing from the southern slope of the Tanggula Mountains. In Biru County, the river begins a series of turns south and southeast, passing through Nyingchi prefecture. Shortly before entering Yunnan, it is joined from the east by the Yu River, its longest tributary within China.

The Tibetan portion of the Salween basin is lightly populated, especially in the frigid headwater regions where precipitation is scarce and river flow depends almost entirely on glacier melt.

In Yunnan, the Salween is known as the Nu River (怒江), after the indigenous Nu people, but also translating literally to "angry river". (The character is only a homophone, due to Chinese having no phonetic script.) For more than  the Salween runs parallel to, and west of the headwaters of the Mekong and Yangtze, separated by high mountain ridges of the Hengduan Mountains. The Gaoligong Mountains west of the Salween form the border between China and Burma.

Much of the river within Yunnan is part of the Three Parallel Rivers of Yunnan Protected Areas, a World Heritage Site.

Continuing south, the river crosses the Yunnan-Guizhou Plateau via a series of deep canyons broken by wider valleys. In Longling County it is joined by the Kuke River and turns west, entering Burma.

Lower Salween (Burma and Thailand)

In Burma the Salween river is officially known as Thanlwin; in Shan State, which the river enters immediately upon leaving China, it is also known as Nam Khone. Turning south, the river slices a winding course through the vast upland region known as the Shan Hills. This area is characterized by a complex, broken topography of small mountain ranges, plateaus and cliffs, through which the Salween has cut an extensive series of gorges.

In Shan State and Karenni State (Kayah State) the river is joined by several large tributaries, including the Nanding River and Hka River from the east, and the Pang, Teng, and Pawn Rivers from the west. The Pang River is noted for its extensive limestone formations near the confluence with the Salween, where it breaks into a myriad of cataracts, channels and islets known as Kun Heng, "Thousand Islands". Inle Lake, the second largest lake in Burma and a World Biosphere Reserve, drains into the Salween by way of the Pawn River.

In Thailand the river is known as Salawin; much of the Thai side of the border is part of Salawin National Park and the Salawin Wildlife Sanctuary. At the south end of the border section it is joined by the northwest-flowing Moei River, which forms the Burma–Thailand border south of this point. In Karen State, the river flows through karst limestone hills where numerous caves and unusual rock formations line the banks, particularly around the city of Hpa-An.

The Salween emerges from the mountains into the coastal plain near Hlaingbwe Township. The river flows for a further  before terminating at a modestly sized delta and estuary in Mawlamyine in Mon State. Here it is joined by the Gyaing River from the east and the Ataran river from the southeast. The Thanlwin Bridge, the second longest bridge in Burma, connects Mawlamyine to Mottama. The combined river then breaks into the Dayebauk (north) and Mawlamyine (south) channels, forming Bilugyun Island before emptying into the Gulf of Martaban.

List of tributaries

Geology
The present course of the Salween began to form about 5 million years ago as the Indian subcontinent collided with Asia, resulting in the uplift of the Himalaya mountains and the Tibetan Plateau. Prior to the Himalaya orogeny, what are now the upper Irrawaddy, Salween, Mekong and Yangtze rivers may have all flowed into the Red River, emptying into the South China Sea. As the continents converged, a complex jumble of mountains arose, breaking the ancestral Red into different drainage systems, with the Yangtze heading east towards the Pacific, and the Mekong and Salween flowing south into what is now Thailand's Chao Phraya River. About 1.5 million years ago, volcanic activity diverted the Salween west towards the Andaman Sea, roughly creating the modern path of the river.

The parallel modern courses of the upper Salween, Mekong and Yangtze are located where the eastern Tibetan Plateau intersects the uplands of the Yunnan-Guizhou Plateau. As the mountains continued to rise, the rivers incised into the landscape along parallel fault zones, creating the deep canyons of the present day. The Nujiang fault zone stretches over  along the river in Yunnan.

The formation of the Himalayas blocked drainage from the Tibetan Plateau south towards the Indian Ocean, forcing drainage north of the mountains east towards the Yangtze river. This east-flowing river, the predecessor of the modern Yarlung Tsangpo river, was repeatedly captured into drainages to the south, finding various routes to the sea via the Red, Mekong, Salween and Irrawaddy rivers. Ultimately the Yarlung Tsangpo was captured by the Brahmaputra River in present-day India. The Salween may once have had additional tributaries above its present source, but due to the uplift of the Himalaya blocking moisture from the Indian Ocean, these tributaries dried up, leaving the numerous terminal lakes scattered across Nagqu today.

The Salween carries an estimated 108 to 237 million tonnes of sediment per year. About 92 percent of sediment is delivered to the ocean during the monsoon season. The Salween delta is physically contiguous with the Irrawaddy and Sittaung deltas. Sediment accumulation is largely balanced out by subsidence and transport by ocean currents. However, proposed dams along the Salween would trap much of the sediment with potential detrimental impacts to coastal erosion.

Ecology
The Salween basin is home to thousands of species of plants, with the highest plant diversity found in Yunnan's Three Parallel Rivers region. The Three Parallel Rivers protected areas include the Gaoligongshan National Nature Reserve and the Nu Jiang Reserve within the Salween basin; the Gaoligongshan reserve has more than 4,300 plant species. The rare Taiwania, one of the largest conifers in Asia, is found here along with more than twenty other conifer species. Due to its rugged and inaccessible terrain, this is considered one of the most intact large forest regions in China. The Mekong–Salween divide forms a significant floral and faunal barrier as well as a rain shadow, and has been regarded as a major driver of plant speciation in the region.

Around the Burma–China border, the Salween flows through the Northern Indochina subtropical forests ecoregion, which consists largely of subtropical broad-leaved evergreen forests, with pine forests at higher elevations and tropical forests at the lower margins. Further south in Burma and Thailand, the Salween basin includes the Kayah-Karen montane rain forests, where the karst limestone landscape of cliffs, sinkholes and caverns lends itself to a multitude of forest types. Limestone soils host drought deciduous forests, while dipterocarp–dominant tropical forests occur on granitic soils. Montane deciduous forests are widespread in the Shan Hills. Mangrove forests occur in the Salween delta, especially on Bilugyun Island.

The basin supports about 151 fish species, with 77 of those found in the upper Salween. The Salween has numerous cyprinid species, including the endangered Garra cryptonema and Akrokolioplax bicornis which are endemic to the basin. Inle Lake in Shan State, designated a UNESCO Biosphere Reserve in 2015, provides habitat for numerous endemic fish species. The Thousand Islands area at the Salween–Pang confluence, as well as the confluence of the Salween and Moei rivers, are also identified as critical fish habitat. The Salween shares most of its fish species with the nearby Irrawaddy and Sittaung Rivers. The river also hosts a number of invasive exotic fish which were introduced for commercial purposes. In addition to fish, the Salween provides habitat for 92 amphibian species. The Salween has the greatest diversity of turtles of any river in the world. The endangered Giant Asian pond terrapin and bigheaded turtle are found here.

The Salween basin includes up to 25% of the world's terrestrial animal species. About one-half of all animal species in China can be found in the upper Salween, which provides habitat for endangered species including the snow leopard and black snub-nosed monkey. The remote jungles of the Salween basin in Burma and Thailand, particularly in Kayin and Shan states, are home to dozens of large mammal species including the Indochinese tiger, clouded leopard, Asiatic black bear, sun bear, eastern hoolock gibbon, and the Sunda pangolin. Limestone caves along the Salween in Thailand are home to numerous bat species, including the endemic Kitti's hog-nosed bat, the smallest known bat species in the world. The Nam San Valley along the Shan reach of the river provides habitat for the critically endangered white-rumped vulture and the slender-billed vulture. In the Salween delta, wetlands provide habitat for fishing cat, Asian small-clawed otter and Siamese crocodile, among other species.

Economic uses

Agriculture
Along its lower course the Salween sustains both flood and irrigated agriculture. The Salween delta is a major rice-growing area; it is the single most productive agricultural region in the Salween basin and home to over 500,000 people. Rice paddies are highly dependent on the river's annual flooding, bringing deposits of rich sediment. Other crops grown in the Salween basin include maize, wheat, chili, cotton, potatoes, groundnut, sesame, pulses, betel, tea, and various vegetables. Certain areas of the floodplain are suitable for both farming and fishing, such as the seasonal Daw Lar Lake upstream of Hpa-An, where crops are grown on islands in the lake during the dry season. Following the annual harvest, the land is used for grazing livestock. In the rainy season fish migrate from the Salween River to spawn in the lake, and are caught in large numbers as the water level recedes at the end of the season. The Salween generally floods in July–September and reaches its lowest around October–December. Compared to Burma's principal rice growing region, the Irrawaddy delta, the Salween delta floods more erratically, and is prone to drought for 1–2 years out of five.

Approximately  of land are irrigated in the Salween basin, with 50 percent in Burma, 42 percent in China and 8 percent in Thailand. About 97 percent is irrigated with surface water, and the rest with groundwater. In recent years rubber, sugarcane and corn have become major cash crops, with the majority of this production exported to China. From 1998 to 2010, the area cultivated for rubber in Mon State increased fivefold, accompanied by significant deforestation.

Further upstream, the river provides a water source for numerous remote villages. With arable land limited by mountainous terrain, farming occurs primarily on the seasonally flooded river banks and islands. However, forest land has been increasingly converted to agriculture, which has led to sedimentation and other water quality issues. The higher elevation valleys are used for grazing, particularly in Tibet, where yaks, sheep, goats, horses and cattle are raised. Forests along the Salween in eastern Burma are home to dozens of medicinal plants crucial to the production of traditional herbal medicines. Some medicinal plants are cultivated, while others are harvested wild in the forest. Many wild species are threatened by deforestation and agricultural conversion.

Fishing

The Salween estuary and delta is a particularly rich fishery, with the complex network of tidal channels providing a diversity of habitats for freshwater, brackish and marine fishes. Subsistence fishing is predominant along the inland channels and bays, while a large commercial fishery is supported offshore. The most important commercial species include Nga pone na (Paradise threadfin) and Nga pyat (Coitor croaker). Prawns and shrimps are important in the local diet. Villages further upstream also depend on Salween fish, with Inle Lake being a particularly rich fishery.

Overfishing combined with lack of regulation has become an issue in the 21st century, with catches in the lower Salween declining as much as 60 percent at some villages. The use of large "bag nets" that result in excessive bycatch, as well as the use of illegal poisons by commercial fishermen, have also contributed to the decline. Increased sedimentation from upstream logging has made the estuary shallower and reduced its productivity, in turn reducing the rate of fish migration and spawning. The Burmese government has made efforts to address the issues, including seasonal fishing bans first implemented in 2012, but these laws have been rarely enforced. An alternative approach, using small, self-enforced community-based reserves where fishing is not allowed, has successfully protected fish populations and species diversity in northern Thailand.

Logging and mining
Forests along the Salween are prime sources of tropical hardwoods including teak, pyinkadoe (red ironwood) and padauk (Burmese rosewood). Logging in the Burmese part of the basin first occurred on a large scale during the British colonial period in the 19th century. Clearcutting has destabilized soils along the river and raised sediment loads. Due to the lack of good roads across most of the basin, the majority of timber is transported via waterways during the rainy season. In China, some forests in western Yunnan were intensively logged until the 1990s, when logging was banned there due to environmental impacts.

The rate of deforestation has increased sharply in the 21st century, particularly in Shan, Karenni and Karen states. Before 2010, armed conflicts made it difficult for logging companies to access many of these areas. After a 2010 peace agreement signed between ethnic militias and the Myanmar Union Government, commercial logging was able to increase dramatically in Karenni State. The Burmese government has banned the cutting of teak, but illegal logging for teak has persisted, driven by strong demand abroad. On the Thai side of the river, illegal logging has been ongoing since the 1990s in Salawin National Park.

In Karen State, limestone quarrying for cement production along the river has increased in the 21st century. There is also increasing sand and gravel mining in the lower river. As of 2015 the Burmese government was seeking international investment in the mining sector, and new policies could lead to considerable increase in mining activity along the river.

History

Human presence along the upper Salween River dates to at least 31,000–39,000 years ago. Archeological evidence includes stone tools and animal remains discovered along the river bank in the southeastern Tibetan Plateau.

The Mon are some of the earliest inhabitants of the Salween basin within Burma, migrating south from China around 3000 BCE, and settling in the Salween delta and adjacent coastal areas. Agriculture was first practiced in the Salween and Irrawaddy basins around the first century BCE. Ancestors of the Karen migrated down the Salween River area from the Tibetan Plateau and northwest China starting around 1000 BCE. Tai peoples, ancestors of the Shan, began moving into the Shan Hills area of the middle Salween from Yunnan around 1000 CE and established multiple independent kingdoms, often known as the Shan States.

The Nu people, originating in the Tibetan Plateau, may have inhabited the areas of the Salween (Nu) and Mekong (Lancang) in modern day China as early as 2000 BCE. The Wa people, who today inhabit parts of the Salween basin on both sides of the China–Burma border, migrated south along the river from Tibet around 500–300 BCE. The Lisu people, also originating in Tibet, arrived in Yunnan sometime before 1000 CE. Chinese records begin to mention Lisu in the late Tang dynasty (618–907 CE). The Lisu originally inhabited areas further east in Yunnan, but over centuries they were pushed north and west towards the Salween as more Han people settled in Yunnan.

Expansion of empires
Martaban (now Mottama) in the Salween Delta was a major trading port on the Maritime Silk Road as early as 200 BCE. By the 6th century CE, the Thaton Kingdom (one of the early Mon kingdoms) ruled the Salween Delta and surrounding coasts from the capital of Thaton. From 738–902 CE, the kingdom of Nanzhao controlled Yunnan and parts of northern Burma, with the Salween forming its southwestern boundary with the Burmese Pyu city-states. Tang China had several overland trade routes with Burma via Nanzhao, which it was allied with at times. One route started from Yinsheng (around present-day Jingdong, Yunnan) and headed west then south along the Salween River, reaching the Indian Ocean at Martaban. Another crossed the Salween around present day Baoshan, heading west towards India.

In the 1060s King Anawrahta expanded the boundaries of the Pagan Kingdom (First Burmese Empire) from its origins in the Irrawaddy valley, conquering Thaton and the other Mon kingdoms in the Salween delta. In the late 1100s King Narapatisithu (Sithu II) conquered most of the Shan States, extending Burmese rule to the western bank of the Salween river from the delta as far north as Yunnan. For almost 500 years, the lower Salween defined the frontier between Burma and the Ayutthaya Kingdom (Siam).

In the late 1200s, the Pagan Kingdom collapsed after invasions of the Mongol Empire. The Mongols had also conquered the Dali Kingdom (Nanzhao's successor). In 1287 the Hanthawaddy Kingdom emerged in the Salween and Irrawaddy deltas. Martaban served as the Hanthawaddy capital between 1287 and 1364. Along the mountainous middle reaches of the Salween River, former Shan vassal states regained their independence. Starting around 1380, Ming China annexed Yunnan and conquered some of the eastern Shan states. From 1436-49, Chinese armies crossed the Salween to wage the Luchuan–Pingmian campaigns against the Shan state of Mong Mao. These wars were an expensive failure for the Ming, and triggered tribal uprisings that fragmented Chinese power in the region.

The Toungoo dynasty emerged in Burma during the 1500s, conquering much of Southeast Asia by 1565 to create the First Toungoo Empire (Second Burmese Empire). King Tabinshwehti captured and destroyed Martaban in 1541. Under the subsequent rule of Bayinnaung, an 800,000-strong army crossed the Salween in 1548 and invaded Siam. This was the first time Burmese rule had been extended east of the Salween river. Subsequently, Bayinnaung moved north up the Salween, subjugating all the independent Shan states by 1557. These victories were enabled in part by the acquisition of firearms from Dutch and Portuguese traders who first reached these coasts around 1511. European mercenaries also fought in some of these battles. At Martaban the Portuguese established a trading post, one of the first European settlements in the area.

In the 1640s, the last years of the Ming dynasty, geographer Xu Xiake explored the Salween River country and determined that the upper Salween, Mekong and Red rivers (previously believed to be part of the same river system) were in fact separate. After the rise of the Qing dynasty China entered a new period of western expansion. In 1717 the Dzungar Khanate conquered Tibet, and China sought to expel them from the region. In 1718 the Qing sent an army but were unsuccessful in reaching Tibet, reaching only as far as the Salween River where they were defeated by Dzungar troops in the Battle of the Salween River. In response, the Qing sent a larger force to Tibet in 1720, driving out the Dzungars and establishing Qing rule of Tibet.

As the Qing pushed into Yunnan, the indigenous Lisu people were driven further west, eventually settling along the Salween in and around Nujiang Prefecture. Although China had been expanding into the area since Ming times, the greatest influx of settlers was around 1700 to 1850. At the same time, Tibet was expanding its influence into western Yunnan. Tibetan parties raided down the Salween valley and took slaves from the indigenous Nu and Derung populations, which were not well politically organized and unable to offer much resistance. On the other hand, the Lisu fiercely resisted efforts to take slaves and land.

In the 1590s Siam had captured the Tenasserim coast, and the Salween delta again became the border with Burma. For more than a hundred years this remained a disputed area, changing hands several times between the Burmese and Siamese. Burmese rule returned to the Salween delta in the 1750s with the expansion of the Konbaung dynasty. Starting in 1759, Martaban served as a launching point for several invasions of Siam, which led to the collapse of the Ayutthaya Kingdom. The Burmese were unable to maintain lasting control over territories east of the river, although Burma regained the Tenasserim coast from Siam in a 1793 treaty.

British rule and World War II

After the First Anglo-Burmese War in 1824, the Konbaung dynasty ceded coastal areas of Burma to the British Empire, including the whole Tenasserim coast south of the Salween River. Due to its strategic location, Mawlamyine (anglicized as Moulmein) served as the capital of British Burma from 1826 until 1852 and as a gateway for overland trade into Yunnan. It became the center of a lucrative timber industry, particularly in teak. Logs were floated down the Salween River to meet oceangoing ships in Mawlamyine port. Forests in the lower Salween basin were extensively logged until the 1890s. Contemporary British maps labeled the river as "Salween", an anglicization of the Burmese name Thanlwin.

At the start of the 20th century, there was still great uncertainty regarding the true sources of the river and how far west it extended into the Himalayas; some believed the upper Brahmaputra River (the Yarlung Tsangpo) might be the true source of the Irrawaddy, Salween or Mekong. In 1935-36, British geographer Ronald Kaulback walked the length of the Salween River from Burma to eastern Tibet, producing some of the first comprehensive maps of the river's course. Kaulback allegedly found giant footprints in the snow while attempting to locate the source of the Salween. His report was one of several that popularized the myth of the Yeti in Europe during the 1930s.

During World War II the Japanese Empire invaded Burma, starting at Mawlamyine in January 1942. The Japanese army, numbering 18,000 against 7,000 British defenders, quickly captured Mawlamyine, forcing the British to retreat across the Salween to Martaban. On February 10–11 the Japanese crossed the Salween and the British fled, unprepared for a siege. The Japanese blockaded the Burma Road constructed in 1938 during the Second Sino-Japanese War, forcing the British to transport military supplies to China across the eastern Himalayas ("The Hump"). The retreating Allied army (primarily Chinese) stopped the Japanese advance at the Salween River on May 5, 1942. After blowing all the bridges crossing the river, the Chinese took defensive positions on the east bank along a  front, at which point the fighting reached a stalemate.

From 1944–1945, Allied forces launched the Salween Campaign to retake Burma and reopen the Burma Road. During the initial offensive on May 11, 1944, about 40,000 troops of the Chinese Expeditionary Force (CEF), led by American General Joseph Stilwell and assisted by US army air forces, crossed the Salween on rubber rafts and attacked the Japanese position west of the river. About 17,000–19,000 Chinese and 15,000 Japanese were killed in the resulting battle, from which the Chinese emerged victorious. In the following days, additional CEF troops crossed the river bringing the total to 100,000, before pushing west into Japanese-held territory. The Salween Campaign concluded on January 20, 1945 with the fall of Wanding. By August 1945 the Allies had retaken Burma from the Japanese.

1948–present
In 1948, Burma declared independence from the British Empire. Soon afterwards, ethnic minorities in the Salween River region, including the Kachin, Karen, Mon, and Shan, sought independence, with armed conflicts between these groups and the Burmese military continuing to the present day. The Karen National Union and Mon National Defense Organization took control of the lower Salween River valley, including Mawlamyine and Thaton, in September 1948. However, they were soon pushed out, leading to four years of confused fighting.

In 1950 Chinese Nationalist troops invaded Shan State after being defeated by the Communists in the Chinese Civil War, with the aim of creating an independent state from which to retake mainland China. With the help of US forces, the Chinese attempted several times to take land on the west side of the Salween River, but were pushed back by the Burmese army. Although the KMT campaign was unsuccessful, many people of Chinese descent continue to live in the area east of the river. These events contributed to political instability in Shan State. By 1958 several insurgencies had become established in eastern Shan State, including one led by the exiled Communist Party of Burma (CPB, or "White Flag Communists"). This area, part of the Golden Triangle, became a center for illegal opium production during the 1960s. Opium trafficking remains a major source of funding for insurgents.

In the 1970s the Burmese and Thai governments began planning for hydroelectric dams on the Salween River, largely within Shan and Karen-majority areas. Starting in 1979 the Electricity Generating Authority of Thailand conducted feasibility studies for hydropower and irrigation diversions on the river. Salween development plans gained momentum in 1988, when the SPDC seized power in Burma and sought cross-border economic development with Thailand and China. That same year, Thai Prime Minister Chatichai Choonhavan presented an economic vision for the Salween border region – from a "battlefield into a marketplace".

In addition to the revenues from electricity production, the SPDC saw dam construction as "part of a strategy to remove ethnic armed groups" from the area. In the years following, the military junta stepped up its attacks in the region, destroying villages and forcing over 500,000 Shan, Kachin and Karen refugees to flee the country, mostly to Thailand. The Salween creates a formidable barrier for refugees, due to its wide fast current, and only small wooden boats are available for crossing it.
 About 150,000 refugees are housed in official camps in Thailand, while hundreds of thousands of more live in illegal camps.

Thailand's Salawin National Park was established in 1994. Before that, thousands of refugees had already settled in this area and the adjacent Salawin Wildlife Sanctuary, with more moving in during the years following. The Thai government has made some efforts to remove them, but due to the vast size of the park, enforcement has been difficult. In 1997 a scandal was uncovered in which logs cut on the Thai side of the river were floated across the river to Burma, stamped "exported from Burma" and floated back to the Thai side, where officials inspected the "imported" timber and approved their sale. Refugees in camps within the parks were implicated in the scandal and forced to relocate. However, "observers of forced evictions have stated that the eviction of Thai-Karen villagers from forest reserves is not done to protect the forests but so that [illegal] logging activities can continue without hindrance and with fewer witnesses."

After the end of military rule in 2011 the Burmese government signed ceasefire agreements with 14 ethnic militias. However, protests followed by armed conflict soon broke out again around the sites of proposed dams, particularly at the Mong Ton (Tasang Dam) in Shan State and the Hatgyi Dam in Karen State. Residents along the Salween River contend the dams would bring no economic benefits locally – as most of the electricity would be exported abroad – while their homes and traditional lands would be flooded with little to no compensation.

Local organizations, including the Karen Environmental and Social Action Network (KESAN), have pushed for the establishment of a "Salween Peace Park" that would manage the river's natural resources sustainably via community forests, wildlife sanctuaries, fishery conservation and protected indigenous lands. The park would cover more than  along the Salween River and its tributaries in Burma. The proposal was inaugurated in December 2018.

Dams

Burma and Thailand
Seven dams have been proposed along the main stem of the Salween in Burma and Thailand, with a combined capacity exceeding 20,000 megawatts of electricity – comparable to that of China's Three Gorges Dam. The reservoirs would flood  of the  total river length in Burma, as well as the downstream ends of several tributaries. Electricity generated by these dams would be exported primarily to China and Thailand. In May 2005, a formal Memorandum of Understanding was signed between Burma and Thailand to jointly develop hydropower projects along the Salween River. Since then, a number of Chinese and Thai companies have partnered to develop these projects. In 2015, the newly elected National League for Democracy (NLD) government was expected to downsize or cancel the dam projects. However, the NLD soon announced the projects would go ahead.

The Mong Ton or Tasang Dam is the largest of the planned dams. The reservoir would flood , splitting Shan State nearly in two. The Hatgyi Dam in downstream Kayin State would be smaller, but would have a more significant impact on the river flow. In addition to producing power, the Hatgyi dam would divert up to 30 percent of the Salween flow during certain seasons into the Ping River, part of Thailand's Chao Phraya basin, to benefit agriculture in central Thailand. A smaller alternative to the Salween diversion would be a diversion of the Yuam River (a tributary of the Salween via the Moei River) to the Ping.

There are numerous concerns surrounding the potential impact of the dams, particularly the effect on agriculture in the Salween delta due to a reduction in the annual floods and sediment supply that maintain soil fertility. Water would be released based on power demand rather than agricultural needs, potentially causing water shortages and saline intrusion in the delta. In addition, there would be numerous ecological impacts, as the dams would block fish migration, and necessitate considerable deforestation to clear the areas to be flooded. The dams would also be located in an area with high earthquake risk.

The Weigyi and Dagwin dams originally slated for the Burma–Thailand border, which would have flooded parts of Salawin National Park, have been suspended since 2015. Five other dams remain in the planning or pre-construction stages. In 2016 the Burmese government announced its intention to complete the remaining dams by 2031.

China

In 2000, China initiated the West-East Power Transfer development scheme, to develop large-scale hydropower dams on its western rivers. The Salween (Nu) River basin within China has an estimated 36,400 megawatts of hydropower potential. The power would be exported to southeastern China, particularly the Guangzhou megalopolis. This included thirteen dams on the mainstem of the Nu, with a total capacity of 21,320 megawatts, and a number of small to medium-size projects on tributaries. In 2003 the Yunnan Huadian Nu River Hydropower Company was created after an agreement between the Yunnan provincial government and the Huadian Group.

The proposal to develop the Nu River, one of China's last free-flowing rivers, was met with large protests from local residents as well as from international environmental organizations. If constructed, the dams would have displaced some 56,000 people. In addition, in 2003 the UNESCO World Heritage Committee had voted to list Yunnan's Three Parallel Rivers region as a World Heritage Site. Many of the proposed dams fell within this area. In 2004 Premier Wen Jiabao temporarily suspended plans to build dams on the main stem of the river, although a number of hydropower projects on tributaries were ultimately built. In addition, the Chalong and Jiquan hydroelectric projects were built on the uppermost section of the Salween in Tibet. After Wen's term of office ended in 2013, power companies made a renewed push for construction of the Nu River dams.

The Yunnan provincial government first proposed a Nu River Grand Canyon National Park in 2007, but did not begin development of this proposal until 2014. In January 2016, Yunnan suspended small hydropower development as well as mining along the Nu River and in May approved the establishment of the national park. In December 2016, China's State Energy Administration formally dropped the Nu River dams from its hydropower development plans. A major factor in the cancellation of the dams was the risk of earthquakes along the Nu River fault zone.

See also
List of rivers of Asia
List of rivers of China
List of rivers of Burma
List of rivers of Thailand
List of rivers by length
List of rivers by discharge
Pai River
Jinsha River
Wang Yongchen
Bogyoke Aung San bridge

References

Citations

Sources 
 Works cited

 
  
 
 
 
 
 
 
 
 
 
 
 </ref>

Further reading
Three Parallel Rivers of Yunnan Protected Areas at whc.unesco.org
Three Parallel Rivers Protected Area at www.eoearth.org
Nature Conservancy: Gongshan Nature Reserve The Nature Conservancy
Rivers Watch East and Southeast Asia
NuJiang River Project
Hydrometeorological Approach to the Upper Salween River (USRB) - copyright by Dr. Christophe Lienert, Geographical Institute of the University of Berne and Kunming Institute of Botany
China Rivers Project
Last Descents River Expeditions
A history of first raft and kayak descents of the Salween in Tibet and Yunnan, China.

External links

 Phoel, Cynthia M., "Bargaining Power", in Oxfam Exchange, Fall 2004.
Salween River Watch NGO
Three Parallel Rivers of Yunnan Protected Areas
Three Parallel Rivers Protected Area
NuJiang River Project
Salween First Descent
Water Diversion from the Salween to the Chaophraya River
Joint Statement of Concern by Shan Civil Society Organizations Regarding Public Meeting by Burmese Government and Hydrochina to Promote Dams on the Salween and Nam Ma Rivers

 
Freshwater ecoregions
Rivers of Tibet
Rivers of Yunnan
Rivers of Myanmar
Rivers of Thailand
International rivers of Asia
Myanmar–Thailand border
Border rivers